Charles Lee Brown (born April 19, 1961 in De Kalb, Mississippi) is a former American football safety in the National Football League. He was drafted by the Miami Dolphins in the 11th round of the 1984 NFL Draft. He played college football at Southern Mississippi.

After his retirement from the NFL Brown became a firefighter and is currently the assistant fire chief for Key Field Air National Guard Base at Meridian Regional Airport.

References

1961 births
Living people
People from De Kalb, Mississippi
Players of American football from Mississippi
American football safeties
Southern Miss Golden Eagles football players
Miami Dolphins players